The Women's 10,000 metres event at the 2013 European Athletics U23 Championships was held in Tampere, Finland, at Ratina Stadium on 12 July.

Medalists

Results

Final
12 July 2013 

Intermediate times:
1000m: 3:19.16 Gulshat Fazlitdinova 
2000m: 6:39.09 Gulshat Fazlitdinova 
3000m: 9:59.94 Gulshat Fazlitdinova 
4000m: 13:19.30 Gulshat Fazlitdinova 
5000m: 16:34.86 Gulshat Fazlitdinova 
6000m: 19:50.34 Gulshat Fazlitdinova 
7000m: 23:08.36 Gulshat Fazlitdinova 
8000m: 26:28.97 Gulshat Fazlitdinova 
9000m: 29:46.47 Gulshat Fazlitdinova

Participation
According to an unofficial count, 20 athletes from 15 countries participated in the event.

References

10,000 metres
10,000 metres at the European Athletics U23 Championships